BG Karlsruhe is a professional basketball club based in Karlsruhe, Germany. The club currently that plays in the third tier level of Germany, the ProB. From 2003 until 2014 the team played in the Europahalle. After this stint, they moved to the smaller Friedrich-List-Halle.

From the season 2003–04 until the 2006–07 season, Karlsruhe played in the Basketball Bundesliga (BBL), the top professional league of Germany.

Players

Notable players

External links
Official website 

Basketball teams in Germany
Basketball teams established in 1993
Bg Karlsruhe